Günter Lach (13 July 1954 – 15 December 2021) was a German politician who served as a member of the Bundestag, and was mayor of Vorsfelde and Wolfsburg.

Biography
In 1970, he started working for Volkswagen as a technical engineer. In 1996, he became a member of the city council of Wolfsburg for the CDU. In 2001, he became mayor of Vorsfelde. Between 2006 and 2011, Lach served as mayor of Wolfsburg. He was a member of the Bundestag from 27 October 2009 until 23 October 2017.

Lach died on 15 December 2021 at the age of 67.

References

1954 births
2021 deaths
People from Wolfsburg
Members of the Bundestag for the Christian Democratic Union of Germany
Mayors of places in Lower Saxony
Volkswagen Group people
Engineers from Lower Saxony